Alexander Abusch (14 February 1902  27 January 1982) was a German journalist, non-fiction writer, and politician.

According to one source he was born into a Jewish family in Kraków, Kingdom of Galicia and Lodomeria, Austria-Hungary. According to another source, he was born in  Nuremberg, where, in the suburb of Gostenhof, he grew up, attended school, served his apprenticeship and had his first full-time job.   His father worked as a coachman and scrap metal dealer, and later opened a hat shop. His mother also worked as a small trader.

Abusch joined the Communist Party of Germany (KPD) in 1918. He was  editor of several KPD publications. In 1937, he became part of the exiled KPD leadership in Paris, later in Toulouse. In 1941, he moved to Mexico, where he became a member of the Free Germany Movement. Between 1948 and 1950 he was part of the party leadership of the Socialist Unity Party of Germany. Between 1958 and 1961 he served as Minister of Culture of the German Democratic Republic (East Germany). It was in his role as Minister of Culture that he ordered the demolition of princely castle of Putbus on Rügen, which was considered the most beautiful in Mecklenburg-Western Pomerania.

He published under the pen name Ernst Reinhardt.

References 

1902 births
1982 deaths
20th-century German politicians
Communist Party of Germany politicians
Members of the Central Committee of the Socialist Unity Party of Germany
Cultural Association of the GDR members
Government ministers of East Germany
Members of the Volkskammer
People of the Stasi
German male writers
National Committee for a Free Germany members
Recipients of the Patriotic Order of Merit (honor clasp)
Recipients of the National Prize of East Germany
Jewish socialists
German expatriates in Mexico
Jewish emigrants from Nazi Germany to France
Jews from Galicia (Eastern Europe)